Journal of Environmental Radioactivity is a monthly peer-reviewed scientific journal on environmental radioactivity and radioecology. It was proposed and started by Founding Editor Murdoch Baxter in 1984 and is published by Elsevier. Its current editor-in-chief is Stephen C. Sheppard (ECOMatters Inc.) and is an affiliated journal of the International Union of Radioecology.

Abstracting and indexing 
The journal is abstracted and indexed in:
 Chemical Abstracts Service
 Index Medicus/MEDLINE/PubMed
 Science Citation Index Expanded
 Current Contents/Agriculture, Biology & Environmental Sciences
 The Zoological Record
 BIOSIS Previews
 Scopus

According to the Journal Citation Reports, the journal has a 2020 impact factor of 2.674.

Notes

References

External links 
 

Ecology journals
Elsevier academic journals
English-language journals
Environmental isotopes
Environmental science journals
Monthly journals
Publications established in 1984
Radioactivity
Physics journals